"Eve" is the first solo single of Jim Capaldi, featuring Paul Kossoff, Dave Mason and Steve Winwood, from his first solo album, Oh How We Danced  1972. The B-side on Island Records was another Capaldi-written song "Going Down Slow All The Way". Although the single charted at 91 in the US, Capaldi's obituary in The Guardian (2005) mentioned that "Eve", despite being "widely admired", in the UK had "mystifyingly failed to give him a hit single."

References

1972 songs
Songs written by Jim Capaldi
Jim Capaldi songs